The standardized uptake value (SUV) is a nuclear medicine term, used in positron emission tomography (PET) as well as in modern calibrated single photon emission tomography (SPECT) imaging for a semiquantitative analysis. Its use is particularly common in the analysis of [18F]fluorodeoxyglucose images of cancer patients. It can also be used with other PET agents especially when no arterial input function is available for more detailed pharmacokinetic modeling. Otherwise measures like the fractional uptake rate (FUR) or parameters from more advanced pharmacokinetic modeling may be preferable.

The SUV is the ratio of the image-derived radioactivity concentration cimg and the whole body concentration of the injected radioactivity cinj,

Discussion 
While this equation looks simple, there are a number of points that need to be discussed, such as (1) the origin of cimg data, (2) the origin of cinj data, (3) time, and (4) units.

Image 
The cimg data may be the pixel intensities of a calibrated PET image. Calculated SUV data can then be visualized as parametric SUV image. Alternatively, groups of such pixels may be selected e.g. by manually drawing or otherwise segmenting a region of interest (ROI) on the PET image. Then e.g. the average intensity of that ROI may be used as cimg input to calculate SUV values.

Injection 
The cinj value is calculated as ratio of two independent measurements: the injected radioactivity (injected dose, ID) and the body weight (BW) of the subject. The ID can be estimated e.g. as difference in the radioactivity of the syringe before and after injection, if deemed necessary with correction for physical decay between each of those measurements and the time of injection. Conventionally the time of injection is t=0. This reference concentration represents the hypothetical case of an even distribution of the injected radioactivity across the whole body. Measured SUV values in particular parts of the body thus quantify the deviation from this hypothetical even radioactivity distribution: SUV > 1 indicates radioactivity accumulation in that region above the hypothetical even radioactivity distribution.

Time (Physical Decay) 
The injection of radioactivity is often followed by a waiting time interval and then a time span during which the PET image data are acquired. After image reconstruction, the image cimg (t) data need to be decay corrected to the injection time point t=0. The time point t may be the image acquisition start time, or in case of a long acquisition duration e.g. the midpoint of the PET image acquisition may be more appropriate. This decay correction needs to be done for each image in case of a series of images acquired after a single injection ("dynamic imaging").

Mass and Volume 
The unit of cimg is MBq/mL or equivalent, based on (a) the pixel intensity calibrated with a radioactive source ("phantom") itself of known radioactivity and volume, and (b) the pixel volume or ROI volume. The unit of cinj is MBq/g or equivalent, based on the measured radioactivity and the subject's body weight. This would give SUV in units of g/mL or equivalent. However, SUV is typically presented as a unitless parameter. One way to explain this simplification is by considering that the average mass density of the human body is typically close to 1 g/mL. Thus, while the body weight is usually measured and used for the SUV calculation, this is implicitly converted to the body volume in mL by division by 1 g/mL resulting in a unitless SUV parameter.

Alternatively, the cimg may be considered implicitly converted into a mass concentration assuming a mass density of 1 g/mL for the ROI volume which is a good approximation for some but not all tissues in the human body.

Equation 
In summary this gives the following equation to calculate SUV at time t post injection,

with (1) the radioactivity measured from an image acquired at (or around) the time t, decay corrected to t=0 and expressed as volume concentration (e.g. MBq/mL), (2) the injected dose ID at t=0 (e.g. in MBq), and (3) the body weight BW (near the time of image acquisition) implicitly converted into the body volume assuming an average mass density of 1 g/mL.

A related measure more frequently used in preclinical PET and SPECT is the concentration in units of % ID/mL (percentage of the injected dose per mL of tissue) for biodistribution analysis. When obtained from radionuclear images, this is equal to

.

In other words, SUV can be interpreted as the % ID/mL normalized to (here, multiplied by) the body weight (or body volume) and expressed as fraction rather than percentage.

Further Considerations 
Some authors replace the body weight by the lean body weight or the body surface area.

Accuracy and Precision 
The SUV can be significantly affected among other things by image noise, low image resolution and/or user biased ROI selection. For the semiquantitative analysis of  uptake in tissue or tumor, several corrections have been recommended (see  and references therein).

SUVR 
The ratio of the SUV data from two different regions within the same PET image (i.e. from a target and a reference region) is commonly abbreviated SUVR. An example is the ratio of regional Pittsburgh compound B PET signal intensity to the average signal of a much wider region. For the SUVR, the injected activity, the body weight and the mass density that are all part of the SUV calculation, cancel:

Outlook and Conclusions 
As of 2007, the SUV concept had only begun to be tested for other radiotracers such as fluorothymidine F-18 and conclusions on its usefulness and robustness in these cases were considered premature then.

In summary, the SUV is a convenient measure for the comparison of  PET images from subjects with different body masses. However, care has to be taken with respect to its pitfalls and with respect to the interpretation of results.

See also 
 Functional imaging
 Medical imaging
 Positron emission tomography
 Fluorodeoxyglucose
 Multi-compartment model
 Patlak plot
 Pharmacokinetics
 Physiologically-based pharmacokinetic modelling

References

Medical imaging